Glenloch is an unincorporated community in Heard County, in the U.S. state of Georgia.

History
A post office called Glenloch was established in 1886, and remained in operation until 1904. Glenloch is a name derived from Scottish meaning "Glen Lake". The name is sometimes spelled "Glen Loch".

References

Unincorporated communities in Heard County, Georgia
Unincorporated communities in Georgia (U.S. state)